Franz Ludwig Wind (born November 14, 1719, in Kaiserstuhl, Aargau, Switzerland; August 25, 1789) was a Swiss sculptor and wood carver.

Life 

Franz Ludwig Wind was born on November 14, 1719. His father was Anton Wind from Reutte in Tyrol. Between 1735 and 1741 he probably completed as apprenticeship as a sculptor in Tyrol.

On August 21, 1749, he applied for the citizenship of his hometown of Kaiserstuhl, Aargau. In 1755, Wind made two urns for the garden wall and ten grimaces for the windows of the Meisen guild house in Zurich.

His main work was the decorative elements and grimaces of the Marschallhof in Kaiserstuhl from 1764, which were knocked off in the 19th century.

In 1773 he designed the façade of the provost's office in Zurzach. The portal of Schloss Schwarzwasserstelz from 1776 is also attributed to Wind.

Works 
 1752: Nepomuk statue on the Rhine bridge in Kaiserstuhl
 1756-1757: Pulpit and cheeks in the parish church of Kaiserstuhl
 1755: Ten grimaces and two urns at the Meisen guild house in Zurich
 1765: The staircase balustrade decorated in relief in the Haus zur Linde and the architectural sculpture of the Mayenfisch
 1767-1768: facade decorations at the orphanage in Zurich
 1772: relief of the coat of arms on the town hall and the customs house portal in Kaiserstuhl
 1773: Facade of the Propsteig building in Zurzach
 1773-1786: altar figures and side altars in the parish church of St. Micheal Würenlingen

References

Sources
 Alois Wind: Bildhauer Franz Ludwig Wind von Kaiserstuhl. In: Argovia, Jahresschrift der Historischen Gesellschaft des Kantons Aargau, Jahrgang 33, 1909, S. 75–85.Bildhauer Franz Ludwig Wind von Kaiserstuhl
 Peter Felder: Barockplastik der Schweiz. In: Beiträge zur Kunstgeschichte der Schweiz. Band 6, Gesellschaft für Schweizerische Kunstgeschichte (Hrsg.). Bern 1988, ISBN 3-909158-06-4, S. 311 ff.

External links 
 

1789 deaths
1719 births
18th-century Swiss artists
18th-century Swiss male artists
Swiss sculptors